The Ohio State and Union Law College, was an independent law school in Cleveland, Ohio that operated from 1855 to 1876.

Founding

The college was founded in 1855 in Poland, Ohio, by the law firm of Judge Chester Hayden, Marcus King, and MD Legett as the Poland Law College.  In 1856 or 1857 it moved to Cleveland and was incorporated under its official name.

Hayden served as dean, with 2 full-time instructors until 1863, when he sold the school to John Crowell, a Cleveland lawyer who became president of the College 1n 1862. The College closed when Crowell retired in 1876.

The College had about 500 students while it operated and  awarded about 200 LL.B. degrees. At the start the course only lasted one year, but this was extended to two years around 1870.  In 1871 the College had 2 professors, 28 students, and a library of 2,500 volumes.

Approach

According to its 1872-73 prospectus, the college aimed to given the student a thorough practical as well as a theoretical legal education. It did this by focusing on practical exercises such as the preparation of legal questions and motions for argument, weekly debates, and trials of causes, in addition to lectures. The prospectus expected that the students attending the course would get as much actual practice in all parts of the profession than lawyers generally have during their first ten year of practice.

Notable alumni

Noted black lawyer John Patterson Green graduated from the school in 1870.
Republican Politician and Judge on the Ohio Supreme Court William B. Crew
Chief justice of the Vermont Supreme Court John W. Rowell

References

Defunct private universities and colleges in Ohio
1855 establishments in Ohio
Educational institutions established in 1855
1876 disestablishments in the United States
Educational institutions disestablished in 1876
Mahoning County, Ohio